Akhundzada Peer Saif ur Rahman Mubarak also known as Mubarak Sahib (1925–2010) was a Sufi scholar of the Naqshbandi Mujaddadi Tariqa, the founder of the Silsila Naqshbandi Mujaddidi Saifia. He adhered to the Sunni Maturidi aqeedah (belief set) and practised the Hanafi school of Islam.

He is known for the induction of Wajad (spiritual ecstasy) during gatherings of Zikr (Remembrance of God). Through him many people have accepted Islam. His followers observe strict compliance with Sunnah, acquire activation of Lataif-e-sitta, and experience Wajad during Zikr.

Early life 
His father, Sufi Hafiz Qari Muhammad Sarfraz Khan, a disciple of Sheikh Haji Muhammad Amin, a sheikh from Qadiriyah sufi order.

Education 
Akhundzada Saif ur Rahman Mubarak's basic education from his father included Qur'an study. When he was 13 his mother died. For formal religious education, he moved to Peshawar in the early 1940s and stayed there for many years, gaining knowledge of Tafseer, Hadith, Usul-e-Fiqah, Aqaid and Tajweed.

After completion of his education he returned to Afghanistan, living in Kunduz. He was allotted land by the Afghan Government in Archi. Akhundzada Saif ur Rahman Mubarak, now a religious scholar, constructed a mosque and himself became Imam and Khateeb of the mosque. He also started offering free Dars-e-Nizami courses to the students, both beginners and advanced.

Entry into Sufism 
During his stay at Archi, Akhundzada Saif ur Rahman Mubarak, who had developed a special interest in Sufism and had resorted to private study for a conceptual understanding of the subject, met Naqshbandi sheikh and Sufi scholar Shah Rasul Taloqani; he requested bay'ah. He was instantly granted Qalbi Zikr and bay'ah in Naqshbandiyah order. During the very first sitting all five Lataif of Aalim-e-Amr were activated. At that time he was 32 years of age.

Shah Rasool Taloqani being old and weak had instructed his salikeen (disciples) to remain in the company of his favorite murid, Maulana Muhammad Hashim Samangani, after his departure. He died in 1381 A.H. Following the instructions of his sheikh, Akhundzada Saif ur Rahman Mubarak got bay'ah from Samangani, who renewed the zikr and started guiding Akhundzada Saif ur Rahman Mubarak in his spiritual journey.

Maulana Hashim Samangani, in 1387 A.H., fell ill and called for Akhundzada Saif ur Rahman Mubarak, who had been granted limited Khilafat, to share the responsibilities of training the other salikeen. This not only provided the opportunity to Akhundzada Saif ur Rahman Mubarak to enjoy the company of his Murshid, but also gave an implicit indication of his superiority over other Salikeen, by the Murshid. Akhundzada Mubarak performed his duties with such vigour and sense of responsibility that his Murshid gave him Mutliq (autonomous) Khilafat.

He spent three years in service of his Murshid after which he was directed to Sheikh Haji Pachero for training in the Qadiriyah. Soon he was bestowed with Khilafat of that order too. He then went to Nowshehra, Pakistan, where he spent some time and imparted coaching to the salikeen in the vicinity. After some time, he returned to Afghanistan and traveled in various parts of the country including Nangarhar, Jalalabad, and Laghman. On instructions by his Murshid, Akhundzada Saif ur Rahman Mubarak returned to Archi where he remained busy spreading the essence of the religion.

Maulana Hashim Samangani died in 1391 A.H. Before his death, he had ordered all his disciples to keep the company of Akhundzada Pir Saif ur Rahman Mubarak. In 1398 AH Akhundzada Mubarak performed Hajj. He also visited Madinah and visited various regions on his journey back to Afghanistan.

Emigration to Pakistan 
Akhundzada Saif-ur-Rahman Mubarak decided to leave Afghanistan in 1978 prior to the Soviet–Afghan War for his murshid who rested in Pir Sabaq, a small town near Nowshehra, where for three years he provided religious guidance. In 1409–1410 A.H., Afridi tribes of Bara offered him land for a meeting house, which he accepted. At this juncture, the Saifi order originated. He built a mosque, Dar-ul-Ulum, and khanqah for a place where he could continue the spiritual training of his disciples.

In Bara his preaching was opposed by Mufti Munir Shakir, a Deobandi cleric, backed by activists of his armed group, Lashkar-e-Islam, who had earlier been expelled from Kurram Agency by the Political Agency due to his active involvement in sectarian violence and who resorted to violence against Pir Saif ur Rahman Mubarak including initiation of FM-based propaganda attacking and burning property.

Due to the tense situation in Bara owing to a conflict with Munir Shakir, Akhundzada Saif ur Rahman Mubarak moved to Lahore. Since then he lived in Faqirabad, Lahore. 

On 27 June 2010, he died. He was buried in Faqirabad, Lahore.

See also
Hadayat us Salikeen

References 

Pakistani religious leaders
Hanafis
Pakistani Sufi religious leaders
Sunni Sufis
Pakistani Sunni Muslim scholars of Islam
1925 births
2010 deaths
Afghan Sufi saints